QMU  may stand for:

 Queen Margaret Union - in Glasgow
 Queen Margaret University - in Musselburgh, near Edinburgh
 Queen Mary, University of London
 Quantification of Margins and Uncertainties